David A. Levy (born December 18, 1953) is an American Republican politician, lawyer and former member of the United States House of Representatives from New York.

Education and early career 
Levy is a graduate of Hofstra University, Village of Hempstead, New York, and Hofstra University's Law School. Before serving as a representative, Levy was a lawyer, utility company executive, and member of the Hempstead Town Council from 1989 to 1993.  He has also served in the News Departments of radio stations WGBB (Freeport, New York), WHN (New York), WINS (New York) and WKJY (Hempstead, New York).

House of Representatives 
A Republican, Levy succeeded representative Norman F. Lent, who was also a Republican and did not stand for re-election in 1992. He sought his party's renomination in 1994, but it instead went to a more conservative challenger, Dan Frisa, who went on to win election but was defeated after one term by Democrat Carolyn McCarthy.

Post congress 
He served as counsel to the town supervisor of Hempstead from 1995 to 2017.

Personal life
Levy is married to former WFAN personality Tracy Burgess.

See also
 List of Jewish members of the United States Congress

References

External links

1953 births
Living people
Hofstra University alumni
Politicians from Nassau County, New York
People from Hempstead (village), New York
People from Johnson County, Indiana
Republican Party members of the United States House of Representatives from New York (state)
Jewish members of the United States House of Representatives
21st-century American Jews